Iraurgi Saski Baloia, also known as Sammic Hostelería for sponsorship reasons, is a professional Basketball team based in Azpeitia, Basque Country, Spain. Founded in 1975, the men's team currently plays in LEB Oro and the women's team in the Liga Femenina 2.

History

Iraurgi was founded in 1975 and takes its name from the Iraurgi valley, located between Azpeitia and Azkoitia. In its first seasons, the club played the provincial competitions of Gipuzkoa.

In 2005, the men's club made its debut in national competition by playing the Liga EBA. The club grew up in the league and in 2009 qualified for the first time to the promotion playoffs to LEB Plata, achieving promotion in their second attempt, in 2010.

The club finished in the last position after its debut season, but remained in the league after the existence of vacant spots. Six years later, on 15 April 2017, the club clinched the title of the 2016–17 LEB Plata and achieved promotion to LEB Oro, second division.

Previously in 2015, the women's team clinched promotion to Liga Femenina 2 but was not admitted in the league by the Spanish Basketball Federation. However, Iraurgi finally registered in the first division, where in their only season they only won two matches out of 26, being relegated to Liga Femenina 2.

Current roster

Season by season

Trophies and awards

Men's team
LEB Plata: (1)
2016–17
Copa LEB Plata: (1)
2019–20
Euskal Kopa: (1)
2014

Notable players
- Set a club record or won an individual award as a professional player.
- Played at least one official international match for his senior national team at any time.
  Ondrej Hanzlik
  Manny Súarez
  Pavel Savkov

References

External links
Official website

Basque basketball teams
Sport in Gipuzkoa
Basketball teams established in 1975
1975 establishments in Spain
LEB Plata teams
Women's basketball teams in Spain